The Volkswagen Beetle (also sold as the Volkswagen Käfer, Volkswagen Coccinelle, Volkswagen Maggiolino, Volkswagen Fusca in some countries) is a small family car manufactured and marketed by Volkswagen introduced in 2011 for the 2012 model year, as the successor to the New Beetle launched in 1997. It features a lower profile while retaining an overall shape recalling the original Volkswagen Type 1 Beetle.

One of Volkswagen's goals with the model was to give it a more aggressive appearance while giving it some stylistic aspects reminiscent of the Type 1. This was an attempt to distance the new model from the New Beetle, produced from 1997 to 2011, which never approached the success of the first Beetle.

The second generation "new" Beetle shares the "A5" (PQ35) platform with the current generation Volkswagen Jetta and is built alongside the Jetta, Golf Variant and the old Jetta ("Clásico") at Volkswagen's plant in Puebla, Mexico.

A convertible version followed the coupé for the 2013 model year, first shown at the Los Angeles Auto Show in November 2012 when it also went on sale.

Head of Technical Development for VW, Frank Welsch, indicated at the 2018 Geneva Motor Show that this would be the Beetle's final generation.

On 13 September 2018, Volkswagen announced that the Beetle production would end in July 2019. The final third generation Beetle (a denim blue coupe) finished production on 9 July 2019 and was presented on the assembly line the next day. The model was officially retired at a ceremony in Puebla City later that day.

Launch 

On 22 November 2010, on the final episode of the Oprah's Favorite Things special, Oprah Winfrey and Volkswagen announced every audience member that day would receive one of the Beetles upon its release in 2011. VW staff gave the audience their special keys to the car. This was followed by a teaser commercial during Super Bowl XLV in February 2011.

To celebrate the global reveal, VW partnered with MTV, to make a debut on three continents on 18 April. The reveal began in Shanghai, China with a MTV Sound System celebration hosted by MTV VJs, followed by MTV World Stage events in Berlin and New York City.

On 18 April 2011, the 2012 model was unveiled as the Volkswagen Beetle, dropping the word "New" from its name. It debuted at the 14th Auto Shanghai and the New York International Auto Show.

During the marketing campaign at Mexico, it was advertised as "The new Vocho" (oddly in English) in the "Das Auto" marketing campaign.

Engines 
The new model retains the front-engine, front-wheel-drive layout of the New Beetle, while improving interior packaging with more room in the rear. Four-cylinder engine options for the European market are expected to include 1.2-litre, 1.4-litre and 2.0-litre TSI petrol engines, and 1.6-litre and 2.0-litre TDI diesel engines. In addition to the 2.0-litre TSI and TDI engines, base North American Beetles were originally fitted with a  straight-five engine (engine code CBTA/CBUA) earlier used on the Golf and Jetta. From 2015 onward, the 2.5L straight-five was phased out in favor of a 1.8L four-cylinder TSI of comparable horsepower ratings but improved torque ratings over the straight-five. 

All engines for this model are offered with an option of a six-speed manual transmission or the option of a dual-clutch DSG automatic. In the United States, transmissions on petrol models come with either a five-speed manual or optional six-speed automatic on 2.5/1.8T models, while on the diesel models there is the option of a DSG six-speed dual-clutch transmission.

Special editions

Black Turbo launch edition 
The first special edition of the 2012 Beetle is the Black Turbo launch edition. It was limited to 600 cars on the U.S. market and will be the first car available through Volkswagen’s new Vehicle Pre-Order program.

Turbo Black 
A Beetle Turbo Black made an appearance at the 30th annual Wörthersee Treffen in June 2011 in Reifnitz, Austria.  It was located on the floating barge showcase at the entrance to the show.  Other cars on the barge included a Reifnitz Edition GTI and the Touareg Racer.

e-Bugster 
It previewed the styling for an anticipated convertible edition of the A5; compared to the conventional Beetle, the e-Bugster was  wider and the roof was  shorter. Unlike other new Beetles, the E-Bugster is a two-seater, true to its Speedster styling, instead of 2+2. Volkswagen allowed journalist Damon Lavrinc to drive the prototype and explained the powertrain components were taken from the contemporary e-Golf that shared the VW PQ35 platform, produced for the California market.

Fender Edition 
In 2012, Volkswagen partnered with Fender Musical Instruments Corporation to release a limited edition Beetle for the 2013 model year. The Beetle Fender Edition uses the Beetle Turbo's front fascia and the 2.5L model's 18" disc wheels. Unique exterior features consist of Fender badges and chrome side mirror covers. The interior features a sunburst dashboard panel that pays homage to the Fender Stratocaster, a 400 watt premium audio system with nine speakers, an LCD screen, and a 10-channel amplifier.

Xbox special edition 
In January 2013, an official Xbox special edition was released. It uses the straight-five 2.5 L (170 hp) and comes in three different colors: Black, White and Silver all of them with the characteristic Xbox colors, panoramic sunroof, rear spoiler and 18" rims. This special edition was available only for the Mexican market.

GSR Limited Edition 
In February 2013 at the Chicago Auto Show, Volkswagen introduced the Beetle GSR Limited Edition. It is painted in yellow and black and only 3,500 will be produced, half of which will be sold in the United States, the other half in Europe. This special edition is modelled after the original 1973 special edition Super Beetle dubbed the GSR or, Gelb Schwarz Renner, Yellow Black Racer in English. It was also the only Volkswagen that was offered with a factory boost gauge.

R-Line 
Volkswagen has started production of a new R-Line Beetle. This new, limited edition trim level comes equipped with the new 210 hp gen3 turbo four, new front fascia and a metal dash plate finished off with 'R' badging all around. Along with increased performance, the new engine is expected to get about 8% greater fuel economy, or around 1–2 more miles per gallon. The engine will be fitted to all Volkswagens that currently use the gen2 2.0l turbo four.

Dune 
A version with a rugged off-road look called the 'Beetle Dune' went on sale in 2016.

Beetle #PinkBeetle 
The Beetle #PinkBeetle first began life as a concept car called the “Beetle Pink Edition”, but was renamed to Volkswagen Beetle #PinkBeetle upon production. It is version with pink accent and exclusive pink color, and was unveiled at the 2015 New York Auto Show alongside the Beetle Wave. It is the only model whose model name is a hashtag in it. The Beetle #PinkBeetle was produced from 2017 to early 2018.

Beetle Wave 
The Beetle Wave, also known as the Beetle Surf, is the concept stage of the Beetle Coast, with two prototypes being unveiled at the 2015 New York Auto Show and the 2015 Frankfurt Auto Show. It is a special version of the Beetle with 2 fully-wooden surfboards, an exclusive orange accent and “habanero orange” color, a houndstooth interior, real wood garnish for the dashboard, chrome mirror caps, 19-inch “Tornado”-design wheels, and Michigan license plates that read “NEW YORK CITY - BTL SRF”. The car pays homage to the Volkswagen Type 2 (T1), as both vehicles were designed for summertime enjoyment. Standard trim options include a soft convertible top.

Beetle Coast 
The Beetle Coast is the production version of the Beetle Wave concept car, officially released on January 1, 2018. It comes with 2 options: retractable hardtop and cabriolet. It is available in Deep Sea Teal, along with surf wood dash accents, a houndstooth interior (carried over from its concept stage) and a sunroof (only available on the Retractable Hardtop option) with disk-design hubcaps instead of the “Tornado”-design wheels from its concept. The Beetle Coast was designed to compete with the Honda Civic, Hyundai Elantra, and the Mazda3.

53 Edition 
A version with red, white and blue stripes running from front to back vertically and 53s on the doors, hood and trunk, made to resemble the paint job of Herbie The Love Bug, was sold exclusively in Spain.

Final Edition 
The Final Edition is the final version of the model sold in 2019 with two colors that were tributes to past Beetle models: Safari Uni Beige and Stonewashed Blue. Three other colors offered are Platinum Grey, Pure White, and Deep Black Pearl. The Final Edition came in both coupe and convertible body styles. There are two trims: SE and SEL.

Yearly American sales 
The previous generation New Beetle Convertible was sold alongside the Beetle Coupe (A5) in 2012. An all-new A5 based Beetle Convertible replaced the New Beetle Convertible for the 2013 model year.

References

External links 

2010s cars
Volkswagen Beetle
Compact cars
Coupés
Hatchbacks
Convertibles
Cars introduced in 2011
Front-wheel-drive vehicles
Retro-style automobiles